Loks Land is an uninhabited island in the Arctic Archipelago in Nunavut, Canada. It is located off the eastern tip of Baffin Island's Blunt Peninsula, close to the mouth of Frobisher Bay. The local Inuktitut name for the island is Takuligjuaq.

Loks Land was the site of one of the stations in the Distant Early Warning Line radar defence network, and had the code number BAF-4A.

The island was visited by Martin Frobisher and is named for Michael Lok, a London financier who was one of the patrons of Frobisher's Arctic expeditions of the 1570s. Frobisher's first expedition found ore which was purported to contain gold, leading to a second and third expedition which failed to find any of the precious metal. These later speculative ventures almost bankrupted Lok.

References

External links
Michael Lok
DEW Line stations

Islands of Baffin Island
Uninhabited islands of Qikiqtaaluk Region
Islands of Frobisher Bay
Former populated places in the Qikiqtaaluk Region